The Carson School, on New Mexico State Road 96 in Carson, New Mexico, was built in 1920.  It was listed on the National Register of Historic Places in 1986.

It was built as a one-room schoolhouse, and was later divided into two classrooms. William Shupe moved his family to Carson in 1912, and together with others built an irrigation ditch, the Arroyo Aguaje de la Petaca, which enabled irrigation of the Carson area. Troy Shupe, one of his sons, was contracted to build the schoolhouse, and Verde Shupe, another son, hauled water, stone and lumber used in the structure. A stonemason, Mr. Willis, shaped the native basalt rock quarried from nearby. The school is the only surviving one of several works by Mr. Willis in the area.

About 40 students attended the school at its peak, when the Carson community had a population of about 150.

The schoolhouse also served for Mormon church services, and occasionally for funerals.  After 1932, when the education was consolidated away, the building was used for community activities such as dances, potluck dinners, and country fairs.

References

Schools in New Mexico
National Register of Historic Places in Taos County, New Mexico
School buildings completed in 1920
1920 establishments in New Mexico